"The Full Circle" is the fifteenth episode of the first season of Space: 1999.  The screenplay was written by Jesse Lasky, Jnr and Pat Silver; the director was Bob Kellett.  The final shooting script is dated 17 September 1974.  Live-action filming took place Tuesday 24 September 1974 through Tuesday 8 October 1974.

Story 
The Moon is passing within range of a habitable planet the Alpha staff have code-named 'Retha'—an anagram of 'Earth'.  A six-man team is dispatched for a preliminary survey.  After several hours, radio contact is lost and Eagle Six fails to return on schedule.  Flight telemetry shows all ship's systems operating normally, and a worried John Koenig orders it flown back to Moonbase Alpha by remote control.  He, Victor Bergman and Helena Russell go to meet the mystery vessel.  They can find no one aboard...until Helena spies a primitive stone axe and a hairy hand nearly hidden behind a seat in the passenger module.

A closer look reveals the sole occupant—the dead body of a Stone-Age man.  While the bizarre corpse is taken to Medical for a post mortem, Koenig plans a rescue mission.  He will lead a search party on the ground, while Alan Carter will overfly the area in Eagle Two in a search pattern centred on the initial landing site.  Sandra Benes will accompany him to make a detailed photographic scan.  Left in command of Alpha, Bergman watches the rescue ships depart.  With just three days remaining before the Moon travels out of range, he admits the disappearances could seriously affect their chance of colonising Retha.

Eagle One sets down at the first expedition's landing site, a clearing in a sub-tropical forest.  As Carter begins the aerial search, he notes a few pockets of mist through breaks in the forest canopy, but no sign of people—Alphan or otherwise.  While the support team reconnoitres the immediate area, Koenig and Helena drive off in a moon buggy, following a series of trail-markers left by the reconnaissance party.  Entering the forest, they leave the vehicle and continue on foot.  At a swampy watering hole, they are brought up short by the tracks of a gigantic animal.

Helena perceives movement in the foliage on the far side of the pool and thinks they are being watched.  Koenig fires a stun-gun blast into the water to frighten off who or what is in hiding.  Hours later, the trail-markers lead them down a narrow ravine blanketed by a dense mist.  The surrounding forest is eerily silent as they enter and are obscured by swirling vapour.  Later, having found nothing around the clearing, the support party is also following the trail.  By sunset, they have reached the ravine.  The team leader reports to Carter that they are approaching an area of mist and hope to catch up with Koenig before dark.  They, too, walk down the passage and into the mist...

On Moonbase, Bergman attempts to call Koenig, but gets no response.  Carter reports that he, too, is unable to contact the Commander.  At their geographic latitude, the night will last only two hours; Carter decides to land and commence searching for the others at daybreak.  Sandra claims to see something moving in the fading light, but Carter cannot confirm her sighting.  He brings the ship down next to Eagle One.  As Carter and Sandra settle in for the night, a trio of cavemen watches the ship from the bushes outside.

The next morning, Sandra awakens to find Carter gone.  Having left early to scout the area, the astronaut has reached Koenig's moon buggy by the time a concerned Sandra calls.  He jokes that all her fussing will make her boyfriend Paul Morrow jealous.   Signing off, he follows the markers, but veers from the designated trail to take a short-cut through tall grass—and falls head-first into a camouflaged pit.  When Sandra tries to call again, she receives no answer.  Nervous, she contacts Alpha.  Morrow consoles her with the news that Bergman is flying down to lead a new search mission.

Carter comes to.  Trapped at the bottom of a ten-foot-deep pit, he begins to dig hand- and foot-holds into the soft clay walls.  His work is interrupted by the three cavemen.  Their spear-carrying leader leaps on Carter like a wild animal.  In the ensuing brawl, the astronaut is beaten senseless.  As the caveman raises his spear to finish him off, he is startled by the buzzing ring-tone of Carter's  commlock.  Fumbling with the device, the spear-man is intrigued by Sandra's image on the tiny TV monitor.  Getting no response, she stops calling—her sudden 'absence' angering the spear-man.  Using a tree trunk lowered by his comrades, he clambers out of the pit and shambles off toward the Eagles.

Ten minutes out from Retha, Bergman calls Sandra from Eagle Three.  After laying out a meal, she opens the hatch to observe their arrival—and is surprised to find the spear-man waiting outside.  He darts inside and, after a struggle, Sandra is carried off by her savage assailant.  During this, Carter regains consciousness and climbs out of the pit using the trunk left by the cavemen.  He makes for the landing site as Eagle Three sets down.  When Bergman and Kano enter Eagle Two, they find only their lunch waiting for them.

Sandra and her captor arrive at the caves that house a small tribe of Stone-Age people.  As the curious adults (there are no children) crowd around her, she attracts the attention of the caveman chief.  After a brief scuffle with the spear-man, the chief claims Sandra for himself and drags her into his private lair, followed by his protesting mate.  When they lean in close to observe her, Sandra shrieks, convinced she has gone mad.  Despite their weather-beaten faces, rotten teeth and unkempt hair, the chief and his cave-wife are dead ringers for Koenig and Helena.

That night, the spear-man steals across the cave to see Sandra.  He presents her with a leopard skin, which she refuses.  His offer becomes more vigorous and, in his attempt to make her to wear the skin, he tears off her uniform tunic.  Her screams wake the chief, who charges out to do battle with the presumptuous spear-man.  A vicious struggle ends with the chief lifting the spear-man over his head and hurling him into the fire pit.  As the victor claims his prize, his mate—also the tribe's medicine woman—tends to the spear-man's burns.

The chief finds Sandra has fashioned the pelt into a serviceable garment.  He stalks her with amorous intent, but is distracted by the shiny medical monitor on her wrist.  She takes this opportunity to bash him in the head with a rock and slip away into the night.  The cave-wife, sensing something amiss, finds her mate alone, battered and insensate.  Wailing, she gestures with Sandra's tunic—stained with his blood—and sends the men out to hunt down the escapee.

Morning finds Bergman and party searching the forest for Sandra and the others.  As they approach the mystery ravine, Carter grabs the moon buggy's control stick from Kano and swerves just before they enter the wall of mist.  He reckons it must be involved in the disappearances.  Everyone has passed this way, entered the mist and vanished.  They opt to go around; on the other side, they come across the cave and hear a moaning dirge.  The cave chief stands swaying before a shallow grave, half-dead and covered with gore, as his mate prepares him for burial.

The arrival of the Alpha party disrupts the funerary ritual.  As the women hide, the chief clumsily charges at the intruders.  Bergman, too, is struck by the uncanny resemblance the wounded chief bears to the missing Koenig.  As Carter prepares to shoot the savage, Bergman forces the astronaut's gun-arm upward and the laser blast goes wild.  Startled by the pyrotechnics, the chief runs off.  When Carter finds Sandra's tunic—stained with blood, he goes ballistic.  Gun drawn, he vows to search the entire network of caves for her—and God help the savages if she has been harmed.

Bergman and Kano take off after the chief, the professor convinced the resemblance is more than a coincidence.  Tracks lead into the ravine and the men go round each way.  Meeting up on the other side, they are shocked to find Koenig, sporting an ugly head contusion, sprawled unconscious on the ground just beyond the curtain of mist.  Fearing cerebral haemorrhage, Bergman rushes Koenig up to Alpha; fortunately, it is nothing more serious than severe concussion.  When the Commander regains consciousness, a relieved Bergman makes light of his suspicions of the cave chief being Koenig.

Bob Mathias presents the results of the caveman's autopsy.  He died of heart failure, frightened literally to death when trapped inside Eagle Six during lift-off.  The doctor first thought him similar to Cro-Magnon man—until discovering he had capped teeth.  Further examination revealed his identity to be that of the first reconnaissance team's pilot, Sandos...de-evolved 40,000 years by some phenomenon.  They realise the professor may have been correct:  if some unknown force was responsible for regressing Sandos into a caveman, it could have also transformed Koenig into the cave chief.

Ignoring doctor's orders, the Commander flies back down to Retha to save Helena and the other transformed Alphans from Carter's wrath.  During this, the cave-wife and her entourage have been skilfully evading Carter in the maze of tunnels.  She returns to the main cavern in time to see that her posse has re-captured Sandra and are tying her spread-eagled to a frame used to dry animal skins.  She howls in triumph.  Carter follows the noise, and finds the vengeful cave-wife preparing to murder Sandra with a crude obsidian blade.  Ignorant of her true identity, the astronaut sets his gun to kill, takes aim—and is pole-axed by Koenig's stun-blast.

Koenig and a rescue party barge in, collect Sandra and Carter, and quickly withdraw.  Led by the shrieking cave-wife, the cavemen pursue.  Consumed by blood-lust, they are easily decoyed to the mysterious ravine, where Koenig and Bergman have prepared an ambush.  Knowing the answer must lie within the mist, they fire repeated near-misses at the cave-people to drive them into it.  The cave-wife is the last to enter.  As the vapour engulfs her, she peers at Koenig with recognition and utters her first intelligible word—John.  Going round to the other side, Koenig watches as restored Alphans, led by Helena, emerge from the mist.

Back on Alpha, all those affected are given a full medical work-up.  The results show no after effects from their experience on Retha.  Bergman speculates the ravine was the nexus of a time warp.  The temporal field present in the mist caused the regression of their bodies (clothes and equipment included) to an earlier stage of evolutionary development; the transformation extended to their minds, giving them a Cro-Magnon level of knowledge and intelligence.  Unfortunately, there will be no opportunity for a proper study as the Moon has since moved out of range of the planet.

To the professor's annoyance, no one has retained any memory of being a Stone-Age person.  He had hoped to learn how the human psyche has evolved after 40,000 years.  Sandra's debriefing shows the inability to communicate fostered fear and anger.  Helena admits the cave-wife expressed feelings of jealousy and vengeance for the same reasons she would.  Bergman ruminates if man ever will change...

Cast

Starring 

 Martin Landau — Commander John Koenig
 Barbara Bain — Doctor Helena Russell

Also Starring 

 Barry Morse — Professor Victor Bergman

Featuring 

 Prentis Hancock — Controller Paul Morrow
 Clifton Jones — David Kano
 Zienia Merton — Sandra Benes
 Anton Phillips — Doctor Bob Mathias
 Nick Tate — Captain Alan Carter
 Oliver Cotton — Spearman

Uncredited Artists 
 Suzanne Roquette — Tanya
 Colin Rix — Eagle One Co-Pilot
 Sarah Bullen — Kate
 Chai Lee — Nurse
 Alan Meacham — Dead Caveman (Sandos)

Music 

An original score was composed for this episode by Barry Gray.  The primitive, percussive compositions would be supplemented with his work from previous Space: 1999 episodes  (especially "Another Time, Another Place") and a track from the film Thunderbird 6.  This would be Gray's last contribution to the programme or any future Gerry Anderson production.  After this, the two men went their separate ways, ending an eighteen-year collaboration.

Production Notes 

 Director Bob Kellett embraced the opportunity this screenplay offered to 'open up' the feel of the programme.  Reportedly, he re-wrote much of the script (penned by American husband-and-wife writing team Jesse Lasky, Jnr and Pat Silver) to realise his desire for this series' first (and only) extensive location shoot.  As the Landaus disliked leaving the confines of Pinewood Studios, their scenes were shot on Stage 'M' (the ravine) and on the back lot behind the studio's ceremonial gardens.  The rest of the cast assembled in nearby Black Park for the scenes set in Retha's lush forests.
 Though delighted by the large role for her character and the idea of the location work, Zienia Merton recalls the trials of this shooting this episode.  First, director Kellett handed her a leopard skin from which to improvise her own costume; he did not want fashionable caveman 'ready-to-wear'—à la Raquel Welch's 'fur-trimmed Maidenform bra' (in the 1966 film One Million Years B.C.), he would say.  The weather was abominable, her uncooperative costume repeatedly exposed her bare chest, and a swarm of insects attacked her legs while she lay on the ground after her chase scene.  At night, the crew gave her brandy to keep warm, and she claims to have gotten rather tipsy.
 Production designer Keith Wilson was able to effectively re-vamp the infamous 'Ice Palace' set from the previous episode "Death's Other Dominion" into the Stone-Age home of the cavemen.  The cavemen were mostly portrayed by the regular Moonbase background extras (including Glenda Allen, Tony Allyn, Sarah Bullen, Andy Dempsey and Christopher Williams).  Alan Meacham, who played the dead caveman in the episode's 'hook', was Martin Landau's stand-in.
 A student of Lee Strasberg and his Method acting, Barbara Bain went home in her cave-woman make-up to practice her primitive vocalisations.  She recalls how her daughter chose this time to bring her first boyfriend home to meet her parents, only to find her mother's face smeared with dirt while she practiced her banshee-like howls.

Novelisation 

The episode was adapted in the first Year One Space: 1999 novel Collision Course by E.C. Tubb, published in 1975.  Tubb would make several changes to fit the story into the narrative of his novel: (1) As this story immediately follows 'Collision Course', Retha would appear from behind Atheria after that world's disappearance; (2) Carter and Sandra were romantically involved after her previous (unseen) break-up with Morrow; (3) The temporally-transformative mist was not confined to one area; when Koenig fired into the ground to frighten away whatever was watching him and Helena, mist rose up from the hole blasted in the soil and engulfed the pair.

References

External links 
Space: 1999 - "The Full Circle" - The Catacombs episode guide
Space: 1999 - "The Full Circle" - Moonbase Alpha's Space: 1999 page

1975 British television episodes
Space: 1999 episodes